Ron O'Neal (September 1, 1937 – January 14, 2004) was an American actor, director and screenwriter, who rose to fame in his role as Youngblood Priest, a New York cocaine dealer, in the blaxploitation film Super Fly (1972) and its sequel Super Fly T.N.T. (1973). O'Neal was also a director and writer for the sequel, and for the film Up Against the Wall.

Early life
Ron O'Neal grew up in a working-class neighborhood of Cleveland, Ohio, to parents Eunice and Ernest O'Neal, a former jazz musician who earned his living as a factory worker. Ernest died when Ron was 16 years old. Six months later his brother, who worked as a truck driver, was killed in an accident. Following these tragedies his mother found a job in a hospital to sustain the family. Ron graduated from Glenville High School and attended Ohio State University, where he became interested in acting after seeing the play Finian's Rainbow. He joined the Karamu House company in Cleveland, Ohio, working with the oldest African-American theatre company in the United States from 1957 until 1964, during which period he appeared in plays such as Kiss Me, Kate, A Streetcar Named Desire and A Raisin in the Sun, while working as a housepainter to earn his living. In 1964, he went to New York, teaching acting classes at the Harlem Youth Arts Program and appearing in Off-Broadway plays.

Career
In 1969, he appeared in the Broadway play Ceremonies in Dark Old Men. In 1969, appearing in Charles Gordone's Pulitzer Prize-winning play No Place to Be Somebody, he garnered even more attention, winning an Obie Award and several other prizes. From there, he moved on to cinema with two minor roles in Move (1970) and The Organization (1971), after which he was contacted by a friend from Cleveland, screenwriter Phillip Fenty, who suggested he star in an all-black film about a drug dealer. Although shot on a meager budget, the film, Super Fly (1972), went on to become a major hit at the box office.

The success of that film led to a sequel, Super Fly T.N.T. (1973), which O'Neal himself directed, and in which he reprised his role as Youngblood Priest. Nevertheless, the movie was a box office failure. Afterward, he was frequently typecast as pimp or drug dealer. In 1975, he returned to Broadway, starring in All Over Town under the direction of Dustin Hoffman and he also appeared in Shakespeare plays during the 1970s, including Othello, Macbeth and The Taming of the Shrew.

During those years, film roles that went beyond stock characters were few and far between, notable exceptions being his roles in Brothers (1977), the television movie Brave New World (1980), and the miniseries The Sophisticated Gents (1981). He had a number of television guest appearances, frequently playing detective roles. He played a recurring role as police detective, Isadore Smalls, in the TV series The Equalizer, which ran for three seasons in the mid-1980s and starred British actor, Edward Woodward. He played the primary antagonist, Colonel Ernesto Bella, in 1984's Red Dawn. In 1988, O'Neal had a recurring role as Mercer Gilbert on the popular NBC television sitcom A Different World, playing the wealthy father of the spoiled southern belle Whitley Gilbert (Jasmine Guy). His appearances lasted through 1992. In 1996, he appeared in the blaxploitation reunion film Original Gangstas.

Personal life 
O'Neal was first married to actress Carol Tillery Banks, from November 1973 until 1980 (divorced), and then to Audrey Pool, from 1993 until his death in 2004.

Death
O'Neal died in Los Angeles on January 14, 2004, after a four-year battle with pancreatic cancer, on the same day Super Fly was released on DVD in the United States.

The Wu-Tang Clan's 2014 album A Better Tomorrow includes a song titled "Ron O'Neal".

Filmography

Actor

 Move (1970) .... Peter
 The Organization (1971) .... Joe Peralez
 Super Fly (1972) .... Youngblood Priest
 Super Fly T.N.T. (1973) .... Youngblood Priest
 The Master Gunfighter (1975) .... Paulo
 Brothers (1977) .... Walter Nance
 The Hitter (1979) .... Otis
 A Force of One (1979) .... Rollins
 When a Stranger Calls (1979) .... Lt. Charlie Garber
 Freedom Road (1979, TV) .... Francis Cardoza
 Brave New World (1980, TV) .... Mustapha Mond
 Guyana Tragedy: The Story of Jim Jones (1980, TV) .... Colonel Robles
 The Final Countdown (1980) .... Commander Dan Thurman
 The Sophisticated Gents (1981, TV Series) .... Clarence 'Claire' Henderson
 St. Helens (1981) .... Otis Kaylor
 Bring 'Em Back Alive (TV series) (TV Series 1982 1983) .... H.H., His Royal Highness, the Sultan of Johore
 Red Dawn (1984) .... Colonel Ernesto Bella
 Knight Rider (TV Series 4X4)
 As Summers Die (1986, TV) .... Daniel Backus
 Mercenary Fighters (1988) .... Cliff Taylor
 Hero and the Terror (1988) .... Mayor
 Zombie Death House (1988) .... Tom Boyle
 Hyper Space (1989) .... Samuel 'Tubbs' Tubarian
 Trained to Kill (1989) .... George 'Cotton' Shorter
 A Different World (1990-1992, TV Series) .... Mercer Gilbert
 Up Against the Wall (1991) .... George Wilkes
 Puppet Master 5: The Final Chapter (1994) .... Detective
 Original Gangstas (1996) ... Bubba
 The Rage Within (2001) .... Captain Lang
 On the Edge (2002) .... Frank Harris (final film role)

Director/Writer
 Super Fly T.N.T. (1973)
 Up Against the Wall (1992)

References

External links

Interview with Ron O'Neal about Superfly from the WGBH series, Say Brother

1937 births
2004 deaths
Glenville High School alumni
African-American male actors
American male screenwriters
American male television actors
Deaths from cancer in California
Deaths from pancreatic cancer
Ohio State University alumni
Obie Award recipients
Writers from Utica, New York
Burials at Forest Lawn Memorial Park (Hollywood Hills)
Male actors from Cleveland
Film directors from New York (state)
Screenwriters from New York (state)
Screenwriters from Ohio
20th-century American male actors
20th-century American male writers
20th-century American screenwriters
20th-century African-American writers
21st-century African-American people
African-American male writers